Richard Pavlikovský (born March 3, 1975, in Ilava, Czechoslovakia) is a Slovak professional ice hockey defenceman. From 2005 through 2013, he played for Krefeld Pinguine in the Deutsche Eishockey Liga (DEL).

In the 2013–2014 season, he began playing for the Orli Znojmo (Eagles), based in Czech city of Znojmo.  The team is part of the Austrian Hockey League, also known as the Erste Bank Eishockey Liga (EBEL) or Erste Bank Hockey League, in English, for its major sponsor. He also competed in the men's tournament at the 2002 Winter Olympics.

His younger brother Rastislav is also a hockey international for Slovakia.

Ball Hockey

Pavlikovský also represented Slovakia at the 1999 Ball Hockey World Championships and won gold medal.

References

External links

1975 births
Living people
HC Havířov players
HV71 players
Krefeld Pinguine players
Leksands IF players
Orli Znojmo players
People from Ilava
Sportspeople from the Trenčín Region
Slovak ice hockey defencemen
Grizzlys Wolfsburg players
Olympic ice hockey players of Slovakia
Ice hockey players at the 2002 Winter Olympics
Slovak expatriate ice hockey players in the Czech Republic
Slovak expatriate ice hockey players in Sweden
Slovak expatriate ice hockey players in Germany